This is a list of singles that charted in the top ten of the Billboard Hot 100, an all-genre singles chart in the United States, in 2022.

Top-ten singles
An asterisk (*) represents that a single is in the top ten as of the issue dated for the week of March 18, 2023.

Key
 – indicates single's top 10 entry was also its Hot 100 debut
 – indicates Best performing song of the year
(#) – 2022 Year-end top 10 single position and rank

2021 peaks

2023 peaks

Holiday season

Notes 

The single re-entered the top ten on the week ending January 1, 2022.
The single re-entered the top ten on the week ending January 8, 2022.
The single re-entered the top ten on the week ending January 15, 2022.
The single re-entered the top ten on the week ending February 12, 2022.
The single re-entered the top ten on the week ending February 26, 2022.
The single re-entered the top ten on the week ending March 5, 2022.
The single re-entered the top ten on the week ending March 19, 2022.
The single re-entered the top ten on the week ending May 7, 2022.
The single re-entered the top ten on the week ending June 4, 2022.
The single re-entered the top ten on the week ending June 11, 2022.
The single re-entered the top ten on the week ending June 18, 2022.
The single re-entered the top ten on the week ending July 9, 2022.
The single re-entered the top ten on the week ending July 16, 2022.
The single re-entered the top ten on the week ending July 30, 2022.
The single re-entered the top ten on the week ending August 6, 2022.
The single re-entered the top ten on the week ending August 27, 2022.
The single re-entered the top ten on the week ending September 17, 2022.
The single re-entered the top ten on the week ending September 24, 2022.
The single re-entered the top ten on the week ending October 15, 2022.
The single re-entered the top ten on the week ending November 12, 2022.
The single re-entered the top ten on the week ending November 26, 2022.
The single re-entered the top ten on the week ending December 3, 2022.
The single re-entered the top ten on the week ending December 10, 2022.
The single re-entered the top ten on the week ending December 24, 2022.
The single re-entered the top ten on the week ending December 31, 2022.

See also 
 2022 in American music
 List of Billboard Hot 100 number ones of 2022

References

External links
Billboard.com
Billboard.biz
The Billboard Hot 100

United States Hot 100 Top Ten Singles
2022